Esa Heikki Kaitila (22 April 1909, Viipuri – 18 June 1975, Helsinki) was a Finnish professor and politician. He served as Minister of Social Affairs and Deputy Minister of Finance from 17 November 1953 to 5 May 1954, as Minister of Trade and Industry from 27 May to 29 November 1957 and as Minister of Finance from 12 September 1964 to 27 May 1966. He was a Member of the Parliament of Finland, representing the People's Party of Finland from 1951 to 1965 and the Liberal People's Party from 1965 to 1966.

References

1909 births
1975 deaths
Politicians from Vyborg
People from Viipuri Province (Grand Duchy of Finland)
People's Party of Finland (1951) politicians
Liberals (Finland) politicians
Deputy Prime Ministers of Finland
Ministers of Finance of Finland
Ministers of Trade and Industry of Finland
Government ministers of Finland
Members of the Parliament of Finland (1951–54)
Members of the Parliament of Finland (1954–58)
Members of the Parliament of Finland (1958–62)
Members of the Parliament of Finland (1962–66)
20th-century Finnish economists